Shaun Berne (born 8 January 1979) is an Australian rugby union coach and former player. He is currently an assistant coach with the Western Force. His professional playing career spanned twelve seasons, where he played for New South Wales Waratahs, as well as Bath, Leinster, and Calvisano. His usual playing positions were fly-half and centre.

Family and early life
Shaun Berne was born in Sydney. Berne attended Marcellin College Randwick and was selected for the Australian under-16 rugby team in 1995. He played club rugby for Randwick and represented Australia under 21s on two occasions in 1999.

Rugby career
Berne moved to England to play two seasons for Bath Rugby from 1999 to 2001, and was selected for the Barbarians in 2000. He returned to Australia to join the NSW Waratahs, making 38 Super 12 appearances and scoring 57 points (including 6 tries) between 2003 and 2006. He was capped on five occasions for Australia A, before returning to Europe.

After a further three successful seasons at Bath from 2006 to 2009, Berne had made a total of 119 appearances for that club all competitions (totalling 282 points), including 27 European caps. He then joined Irish province Leinster for two seasons, coached by Michael Cheika. Berne played the final two seasons of his professional career at Italian club Calvisano.

Coaching
Berne worked as a coach in Leinster's elite player development program in 2015–16, before signing with the Western Force as attack coach in 2017.

References

External links
Bath Rugby profile
Heineken Cup Profile
 Fiche de Shaun Berne sur le site non-officiel francophone du Leinster Rugby

1979 births
Living people
Bath Rugby players
Barbarian F.C. players
Leinster Rugby players
New South Wales Waratahs players
Rugby Calvisano players
Australian expatriate rugby union players
Australian rugby union coaches
Expatriate rugby union players in England
Expatriate rugby union players in Italy
Australian expatriate sportspeople in Italy
Australian expatriate sportspeople in England
Australian expatriate sportspeople in Ireland
Melbourne Rebels coaches
Western Force coaches